Tatekawa (written: 立川 or 建川) is a Japanese surname. Notable people with the surname include:

, Japanese rugby union player
, Japanese rakugo performer
, Japanese diplomat and general
Tatekawa Oyakata (born 1972), Japanese sumo wrestler and coach

Japanese-language surnames